Kruckenberg is a German locational surname, which originally meant a person from the village of Kruckenberg, just east of Regensburg, Germany. The name may refer to: 

Carl Kruckenberg (1881–1940), Swedish horse rider
Franz Kruckenberg (1882–1965), German engineer

See also 
Krukenberg

References

German-language surnames